John Misael Riascos Silva (born 29 March 1991) is a Colombian footballer who plays as a midfielder.

References

Colombian footballers
Saudi Professional League players
Uruguayan Primera División players
1991 births
Living people
Deportivo Pasto footballers
Boyacá Chicó F.C. footballers
América de Cali footballers
Al Batin FC players
Peñarol players
Expatriate footballers in Saudi Arabia
Expatriate footballers in Uruguay
Association football midfielders
Sportspeople from Nariño Department